Bobby Darin Sings Doctor Dolittle  is an album by American singer Bobby Darin, released in 1967. It was arranged and conducted by Roger Kellaway. The album sold poorly, received little label promotion and was subsequently dropped from the label's catalog. This, in part, was to blame for Darin's separation from Atlantic and the beginning of his own label, Direction.

Reception

Music critic JT Griffith wrote in his Allmusic review  "Not an essential Darin album, even to crazed fans. The songs are solid but the material is (obviously) neither his most weighty nor his most fun... One of the few genuine missteps in Darin's career."

Track listing 
All songs written by Leslie Bricusse

Side one
 "At the Crossroads" – 2:34
 "When I Look in Your Eyes" – 2:56
 "I Think I Like You" – 2:21
 "Where Are the Words" – 2:48
 "Something in Your Smile" – 3:30

Side two
 "Fabulous Places" – 2:37
 "My Friend, the Doctor" – 2:59
 "Beautiful Things" – 2:26
 "After Today" – 3:01
 "Talk to the Animals" – 3:18

Personnel
Bobby Darin – vocals
Roger Kellaway – arranger, conductor
John Haeny – recording engineer
Haig Adishian - album design
Studio Five - cover photograph

References 

1967 albums
Bobby Darin albums
Atlantic Records albums
Albums produced by Ahmet Ertegun